Buckacre was an American rock band from the Illinois River Valley, operating in the mid-1970s. Group members included the guitarist/vocalist Les Lockridge, drummer Dick Verucchi, guitarist/violinist/vocalist Alan Thacker, bassist/vocalist Dick Hally and guitarist/steel guitarist/vocalist Darrell Data. They released two albums on MCA Records - Morning Comes (1976), which was produced by Glyn Johns, and a self-titled album (1978), produced by Win Kutz.  In 1977 Lockridge's interim replacement was the  Illinois guitarist and songwriter J.R. "Roger" Cooper.  Lockridge was eventually replaced on the second album by the keyboardist, David Anson. Lester "Les" Lockridge died on June 1, 2010, in Spring Valley, Illinois, from Lou Gehrig's disease. He was 62 years old.

References

Rock music groups from Illinois
Musical quintets